Benjamin Leuchter (born 22 November 1987) is a German racing driver currently competing in the World Touring Car Cup. Having previously competed in the ADAC TCR Germany Touring Car Championship, German Formula Three Championship and Formula BMW amongst others.

Racing career
Leuchter began his career in 2002 in Karting, he continued in karting until 2003. In 2004 he switched to the Formula BMW series, he finished the season nineteenth in the championship standings that year. The following year he only took part in the first eight races of the season, but still finished fifteenth in the Formula BMW standings in 2005. For 2006 he switched to the German Formula Three Championship, driving the last round of the championship that year. For 2008 he took part in the 24 Hours of Nürburgring, finishing fourth in the SP1/2 class. In 2009 he switched to the ADAC Procar Series, finishing tenth in the Division II standings. For 2015 he raced in the VLN series, racing in the BMW M235i Racing Cup, he finished the season sixth in the standings that year. Continuing in the series for 2016, again racing in the BMW M235i Racing Cup class, this time finishing tenth in the standings. The same year he also raced in the inaugural 2016 ADAC TCR Germany Touring Car Championship season, taking a couple of podiums and fastest laps on his way to finishing fifth in the championship standings. For 2017 he returned to the VLN series, this time racing in the TCR class. Taking several victories, pole positions and podiums, on his way to winning the class.

In November 2017 it was announced that he would race in the TCR International Series, driving a Volkswagen Golf GTI TCR for WestCoast Racing.

Racing record

Complete TCR International Series results
(key) (Races in bold indicate pole position) (Races in italics indicate fastest lap)

Complete World Touring Car Cup results
(key) (Races in bold indicate pole position) (Races in italics indicate fastest lap)

Complete 24 Hours of Nürburgring results

References

External links
 
 

1987 births
Living people
TCR International Series drivers
German racing drivers
24H Series drivers
Sportspeople from Duisburg
Formula BMW ADAC drivers
World Touring Car Cup drivers
Sébastien Loeb Racing drivers
Josef Kaufmann Racing drivers
Nürburgring 24 Hours drivers
Volkswagen Motorsport drivers
Engstler Motorsport drivers
TCR Europe Touring Car Series drivers